Zurmi is a Local Government Area in Zamfara State, Nigeria.

It has an area of 2,834 km and a population of 293,837 at the 2006 census.

The postal code of the area is 882. it shares border with Niger republic from the North and Katsina state from East
its end stop at the most populated village  Gurbin Bore under Kwashabawa ward after Crossed the inter-state Bridge constructed in the early 1990, 4 years after the establishment of the Whole state in 1996.

References

Local Government Areas in Zamfara State